Niles A. Pierce is an American mathematician, bioengineer, and professor at the California Institute of Technology. He is a leading researcher in the fields of molecular programming and dynamic nucleic acid nanotechnology. His research is focused on kinetically controlled DNA and RNA self-assembly. Pierce is working on applications in bioimaging.

Pierce graduated as the Valedictorian  of the Princeton University class of 1993 with a BSE in Mechanical & Aerospace Engineering. He then attended Oxford University as a Rhodes Scholar, an achievement repeated nine years later by his sister Lillian Pierce. He completed a DPhil in Applied Mathematics in 1997. He joined the faculty of the California Institute of Technology in 2000.

Works

Resources

 NUPACK is a growing software suite for the analysis and design of nucleic acid structures, devices, and systems.
 Molecular Technologies develops and supports programmable molecular technologies for reading out and regulating the state of endogenous biological circuitry.

Startup Company
 Molecular Instruments, Inc. designs and synthesizes molecular kits for multiplexed quantitative bioimaging in academic research, drug development, and clinical diagnostics.

References

External links
 

Living people
California Institute of Technology faculty
American bioengineers
DNA nanotechnology people
American Rhodes Scholars
Year of birth missing (living people)
Alumni of the University of Oxford
Princeton University alumni